Fighting Spirit Unleashed was a professional wrestling event promoted by New Japan Pro-Wrestling (NJPW). The event took place on September 30, 2018 at the Walter Pyramid in Long Beach, California. It was the fifth event produced by NJPW in the United States.

Wrestlers from U.S. promotion Ring of Honor (ROH) - with which NJPW has a partnership - also appeared on the card.

Production

Background
On July 6, 2018, NJPW announced their return to the United States to host two events in the state of California: Fighting Spirit Unleashed, in Long Beach, on September 30 and Lion's Break: Project 1, in Anaheim, on November 10 and 11.

The event will be broadcast in the United States on AXS TV, airing October 5, 2018 on delay. As the usual AXS TV commentator Josh Barnett will be unable to attend the event, commentary will be provided by Jim Ross and his replacement Kevin Kelly. Worldwide, the event will be streamed live on NJPW's streaming service, NJPW World.

On August 28, 2018, New Japan Pro-Wrestling announced several wrestlers for the event with soon-to-be-announced matches at Fighting Spirit Unleashed.

Storylines
Fighting Spirit Unleashed will feature eight to ten professional wrestling matches that will involve different wrestlers from pre-existing scripted feuds and storylines. Wrestlers portray villains, heroes, or less distinguishable characters in the scripted events that build tension and culminate in a wrestling match or series of matches.

On the final day of the G1 Climax, Cody pinned the IWGP United States Heavyweight Champion Juice Robinson and got the victory in a tag team match featuring he and Hangman Page versus Robinson and David Finlay. Afterwards he proceeded to challenge Robinson for his title, setting up the match for this event.

At the G1 Special in San Francisco, Kenny Omega defeated Cody in a singles match for the IWGP Heavyweight Championship. It seemingly ended the civil war within their stable, Bullet Club, that had originated on the second day of The New Beginning in Sapporo. After the Young Bucks (Nick and Matt Jackson) stepped into the ring to congratulate Omega, the Guerrillas of Destiny (Tama Tonga and Tanga Loa) and their father King Haku appeared on the stage and turned on various other Bullet Club members, including Hangman Page, Marty Scurll, Yujiro Takahashi, Chase Owens and Cody, forming a new Bullet Club subgroup in the process: Bullet Club OG. On the final day of the G1 Climax, the Bullet Club OG (Tonga, Loa and Taiji Ishimori) defeated the Bullet Club Elite (Nick Jackson, Matt Jackson and Marty Scurll) to win the NEVER Openweight 6-Man Tag Team Championship. The Young Bucks will now defend the IWGP Tag Team Championship against the Guerrillas of Destiny.

At the G1 Special in San Francisco, the IWGP Junior Heavyweight Champion Hiromu Takahashi injured his neck in a title defense against Dragon Lee. He was forced to relinquish the title, with a four-man tournament being announced to crown a new champion. Will Ospreay will face Marty Scurll in the second semifinal, with the winner advancing to the final to be held at King of Pro-Wrestling to face the winner of the first semifinal, Kushida or Bushi). With Kushida defeating Bushi at Destruction in Kobe, Marty Scurll will face Kushida in the finals.

Results

References

External links
Official New Japan Pro-Wrestling website

New Japan Pro-Wrestling shows
2018 in professional wrestling
September 2018 events in the United States
Professional wrestling in California
Events in California
2018 in California
Events in Long Beach, California